Operation Lincoln was a CIA program in which travelers to the Soviet Union would be briefed before a trip to the USSR, then debriefed after they returned.

Notes

Central Intelligence Agency operations
Soviet Union–United States relations
Espionage in the Soviet Union